Anna Kańtoch (28 December 1976 in Katowice, Poland) is a Polish writer of fantasy and crime fiction. She has published fourteen novels and numerous short stories.

Her 2008 short story Światy Dantego, 2010 short story Duchy w maszynach, 2013 short story Człowiek nieciągły, 2014 short story Sztuka porozumienia and 2009 novel Przedksiężycowi all received the Janusz A. Zajdel Award.

References

External links
 Story Długie Noce from the Domenic Jordan cycle in Fahrenheit

1976 births
Living people
People from Katowice
Polish fantasy writers
Polish crime fiction writers
Polish crime writers